The 1996 ITC Silverstone round was the seventh round of the 1996 International Touring Car Championship season. It took place on 18 August at the Silverstone Circuit.

Klaus Ludwig won the first race, starting from pole position, driving an Opel Calibra V6 4x4, and Gabriele Tarquini gained the second one, driving an Alfa Romeo 155 V6 TI.

Classification

Qualifying

Race 1

Notes:
 – Michael Bartels was disqualified for causing collisions with Dario Franchitti and Kurt Thiim.

Race 2

Standings after the event

Drivers' Championship standings

Manufacturers' Championship standings

 Note: Only the top five positions are included for both sets of drivers' standings.

References

External links
Deutsche Tourenwagen Masters official website

1996 International Touring Car Championship season